Zajączki may refer to the following places:
Zajączki, Kalisz County in Greater Poland Voivodeship (west-central Poland)
Zajączki, Ostrzeszów County in Greater Poland Voivodeship (west-central Poland)
Zajączki, Podlaskie Voivodeship (north-east Poland)
Zajączki, Lidzbark County in Warmian-Masurian Voivodeship (north Poland)
Zajączki, Ostróda County in Warmian-Masurian Voivodeship (north Poland)